The 1983 New Zealand rugby union tour of Australia was the All Blacks' seventeenth tour of Australia and their first one-off test tour since 1979. The tour was a one-off match between Australia and New Zealand at the Sydney Cricket Ground, Sydney. Considered the better side, and with the odds in their favour (6–4), New Zealand had only won five of their last ten fixtures against the Wallabies (50%). Australia were 9–10 outsiders, however, Wallabies coach Bob Dwyer commented: “The All Black aura of domination of five or six years ago is over... They were once supermen who couldn't be beaten but that All Black bogey doesn't exist any more.” New Zealand won the test 8–18. The match was also David Campese's fourth match against the All Blacks.

References

 
Lists of national rugby union team results
Matches
Australia